Mel Novak (born June 16, 1942) is an American actor who is best known for villainous roles in Black Belt Jones, Game of Death, and An Eye for an Eye. He is also known for doing all of his own stunts and fighting scenes.

Career

1970s to 1980s
Born in Pittsburgh to Serbian parents as Milan Mrdjenovich (Milan Mrđenović), Novak made his film debut in 1974, appearing in two blaxploitation films, Truck Turner starring Isaac Hayes and Black Belt Jones starring Jim Kelly that was directed by Robert Clouse that led to a part in Clouse's The Ultimate Warrior (1975) starring Yul Brynner. Cat in the Cage (1978) starring Sybil Danning, and others followed. One of his more high-profile parts from the 70's was as the hitman Stick in Game of Death (1978), again directed by Robert Clouse. Novak also had roles in two Chuck Norris films, A Force of One (1979) and An Eye for an Eye (1981). Since the turn of the 80's, Novak has been acting mostly in independent features, such as Lovely But Deadly (1981) for director/producer David Sheldon, starring B-movie heroine Lucinda Dooling.

1990s to 2000s
In the '90s, he appeared in two films for director Garry Marshall: Exit to Eden (1994), based on the novel by Anne Rice, and Dear God (1996). 

In 2005, he appeared in the action/horror film Vampire Assassin, also featuring Gerald Okamura, with whom Novak has acted in several films, and Rudy Ray Moore. In 2008, Novak was inducted in the Martial Arts Hall of Fame in London.  In 2015, Novak had a prominent role in the action film, Samurai Cop 2: Deadly Vengeance.

Personal life
Novak is also an ordained minister, known for doing celebrity funerals and memorials for the likes of Chuck Connors' son, Jeffrey Alan Connors, and Tim Burton's father, Bill Burton. He has worked in skid row and prison ministry for over 39 years.  He also has two daughters, Nikol and Lea, and three grandchildren from daughter Lea.

Filmography

Bibliography

References

External links

A Nanarland.com interview

American Christian clergy
American male film actors
American male television actors
American people of Serbian descent
Male actors from Pittsburgh
Living people
1942 births
20th-century American male actors
21st-century American male actors